Chuck Colby was an electronics engineer and chief-inventor, founder and president of Colby Systems Corporation, a company that created the first DVR-based video surveillance systems but is also very notable as a pioneer in portable computing, being the first to market both DOS and Macintosh portable computers, as well as a remarkable number of other technological firsts.

Early Inventions
Colby's first invention was the Colby TR-2 transistor radio, which he designed at the precocious age of 12 and sold to family, friends and customers on his paper-route, and is possibly the first pocket transistor radio.  At 15, he built for his high school science project the world's first home earth satellite station capable of receiving signals from the Russian satellite Sputnik.  As a college student, his passion for radio and inventing brought him attention in the LA Times when he and a friend built their own TV stations to broadcast video to each other over the airwaves.  Shortly afterwards, he built a video security system for use by NASA.

Chuck Colby also helped design the "Syzygy" original prototype of Atari Pong that was built into a suitcase so that it could be carried around and demonstrated to potential investors.  On July 10, 2003, he donated the prototype to the DigiBarn Computer Museum.

In the 1980s, Colby created and marketed the first PC clone motherboard and was among the first to market with portable, expandable DOS-compatible computer such as the Colby PC-1 and PC-5 while most other companies were only producing portable computers that ran CP/M.  This is a notable milestone as CP/M systems were generally fixed to 64Kb while the DOS offered applications the ability to directly address a full megabyte, allowing for larger and considerably more powerful applications. Colby Systems would continue this trend by producing some of the very earliest and, for a time, only Apple-sanctioned vendor of Macintosh-compatible portables such as the ruggedized "luggable" MacColby and the WalkMac laptop, which could be purchased with a 68030-based SE/30 motherboard which generated sales even after Apple's first laptop hit the market because Apple's Macintosh Portable was only available with the considerably slower 68000 microprocessor as used in the original Macintosh.

Colby is also mentioned in Steve Wozniak's book iWoz as having introduced Wozniak to early satellite television, which was mentioned as the impetus for Wozniak to leave Apple so he could design, then start a company to market, the first programmable learning TV remote, the CL 9.  Steve Wozniak recently wrote in an e-mail to Chuck Colby: "You are the greatest inventor I know. I'd gladly trade places. I hope you get more and more recognition."  Nolan Bushnell, who founded Atari and Chuck E. Cheese's Pizza-Time Theaters, wrote "Chuck Colby is a fountain of ideas and represents the best of a creative person one that thinks of things and then can build them."

In November 2020, Colby's estate attested that he had passed away.

Inventions

 Classmate Tablet Computer
 IBM Clone Motherboard
 Portable DOS machine
 PDA and Wearable Computer
 Telephone Answering Machine
 Cassette Fast-Winder
 Cantaloupe Grading Machine
 Home Satellite Earth Station
 Low Cost TV Camera
 Police Hostage Phone
 DVD Jukebox
 Police Radar Detector
 Police CarMac
 Underwater TV Camera
 Pocket Transistor Radio
 Video Modem
 Portable Video Editor
 Pocket Data Terminal
 Corded Keyboard/Trackball
 Low Cost 1" Sq TV Camera
 Low Cost Digital Stopwatch
 Plasma Display Mac
 Driver Awake
 Color Organ
 Low Cost Video Earth Station
 Police Car DVR/Computer
 Wireless Telephone
 Digital Airport Security System
 Casino Recorder in Las Vegas
 Low Cost Video Conferencing System
 Video Security System for NASA
 MPEG-2 Digital Video Recorder
 MPEG-1 Digital Video Recorder
 Portable Mac
 Mac Laptop
 Heads-up Display Mac
 Tempest Mac
 Portable Pong
 Video thru Cellular Transmission System
 Low Cost Carry-on PeopleMover
 Wireless 2-Way Video Conferencing System
 Ergonomic Robotic Controller
 One way motion sensing switch
 Customized '49 Studebaker
 TV production Van with 4 Channel Audio
 Citizen Band Walkie-Talkies
 Hand Held Laser Pointer
 Robot with 4-way Articulating Wheels
 Voice Activated Switch
 Portable Paging Center
 Portable Video Editing System
 Colby DVR-5000
 Mobile TV Units for the Army
 Telephone Remote Activation Switch
 Color Videomodem VM-4
 Wireless Video Cameras
 Phone Card Dialer
 Video editing system using 2 " tape
 TV Camera in Viewfinder of 35mm Film Camera
 Sing and Strum Wireless guitar Pickup
 Scuba Slurp Gun
 Rack mount PC
 Low cost folding motorized wheelchair
 Low-cost VideoPhone
 Transportable Satellite Uplink Station
 Streaming MPEG Video via T1 Line System
 MPEG-2 Portable DVR
 Low-Cost 360 Degree TV Camera

References

External links
 

American electronics engineers
20th-century American inventors
American computer businesspeople
Amateur radio people
Year of birth missing
Year of death missing